was the thirty-first of the sixty-nine stations of the Nakasendō. It is located in the central part of the present-day city of Shiojiri, Nagano Prefecture, Japan.

History
The area was named "Seba," which means "washing a horse," when a retainer of Minamoto no Yoshinaka washed his master's horse in the waters here. Seba-juku was originally established in 1614, along with Shiojiri-juku and Motoyama-juku, in order to accommodate the change in the Nakasendō's route.

Neighboring post towns
Nakasendō
Shiojiri-juku - Seba-juku - Motoyama-juku

Stations of the Nakasendō
Stations of the Nakasendo in Nagano Prefecture